was a feudal domain under the Tokugawa shogunate of Edo period Japan, located in Hitachi Province (modern-day Ibaraki Prefecture), Japan. It was centered on Shishido Jin'ya in what is now part of the city of Kasama, Ibaraki.  It was ruled for much of its history by a junior branch of the Mito Tokugawa clan.

History
When the new Tokugawa shogunate moved the powerful Satake clan north into Dewa Province, part of the lands they were given were occupied by the Akita clan. Shishido Domain was created for Akita Sanesue in 1602 out of part of the former Satake lands in Hitachi Province. He was replaced by his son Akita Toshisue in 1630, who was subsequently transferred to Miharu Domain in Mutsu Province and the domain reverted to direct control by the shogunate.

Shishido Domain was revived in 1682 for Matsudaira Yorio, the 7th son of Tokugawa Yorifusa of Mito Domain by order of Tokugawa Mitsukuni.  The domain played a leading role in the pro-sonno joi Tengu Party Revolt of the early Bakumatsu period under the rule of Matsudaira Yorinori in 1864. After the failure of the revolt, Yorinori and many of the samurai of the domain were put to death and the domain officially suppressed.
However, after the Meiji restoration, Shishido Domain was restored under Matsudaira Yoritaka, who was recalled from retirement and who served until the abolition of the han system in 1871.

The site of Shishido Jin'ya is now an Inari Shrine; however, the large main gate of the jin’ya survives, and is projected as an Ibaraki Prefectural Important Cultural Property.

The domain had a total population of 6398 people in 978 households per a census in 1869.

Holdings at the end of the Edo period
Unlike most domains in the han system, Shishido Domain consisted of a single continuous territory which was calculated to provide its assigned kokudaka, based on periodic cadastral surveys and projected agricultural yields.

Hitachi Province
27 villages in Ibaraki District

List of daimyō

References

External links
 Shishido on "Edo 300 HTML"

Notes

1871 disestablishments in Japan
Domains of Japan
History of Ibaraki Prefecture
Hitachi Province
Mitorenshi-Matsudaira clan
States and territories disestablished in 1871